Kolxəlfəli (also, Këlkhalfali and Kel-Khalfaly) is a village in the Agstafa Rayon of Azerbaijan.  The village forms part of the municipality of Pirili.

References 

Populated places in Aghstafa District